Leptops is a genus of weevils belonging the family Curculionidae.

Species
 Leptops iliaca (Francis Polkinghorne Pascoe)

References

Curculionidae genera